= Julio Julián =

Mexican opera tenor

Julio Julián (born 15 August 1935) is a Mexican operatic tenor, primarily known for zarzuela. His three sisters formed the trio Las Hermanas Julián.

Julián was born Mexico City. His career debut was in 1955 when he participated in Mexico's renowned "Opera Nacional". He was seen and heard in various performances for radio and television in the 1950s, when he was signed by RCA records.

He lived in Spain for a time, where he continued in his interest in opera and concerts. There, he married the Spanish soprano zarzuela singer Conchita Domínguez, and later moved to the United States. He retired from operatic performance in the mid-1980s to teach music.

He is a Jehovah's Witness.

== Performances and recordings ==
- Espiritu Gentil
- Perfume de Gardenias
- Ch’ella mi Creda
- Ojos Tapatios
- Nessun Dorma
- Un Millon de Primaveras
- Jurame
- You raise me up
